The Mill is a 2013 period television drama broadcast on Britain's Channel 4. It was developed by Emily Dalton using stories from the archives of the National Trust Property. It is based on real-life stories and people of the textile mill workers at Quarry Bank Mill in Cheshire, England, combined with fictional characters and events. The program is also filmed in Cheshire.

The first series, written by John Fay, is set in 1830s Britain during the Industrial Revolution. It was directed by James Hawes and produced by Caroline Levy.

The second and final series, which began airing on 20 July 2014, is set between 1838 and 1842, four years after the first series. The series was cancelled by Channel 4 in 2014, leaving the story unfinished.

Plot
The Mill tells the story of life in Quarry Bank Mill in Cheshire during the 1830s through the eyes of central characters, Esther Price and Daniel Bate. Esther is played by Kerrie Hayes and is a young millworker who risks her own position to stand up for justice. Daniel is played by Matthew McNulty and is a progressive young engineer with a troubled past. Based on the extensive historical archive of Quarry Bank Mill in Cheshire and real people's lives, the series depicts Britain at a time when the industrial revolution is changing the country beyond recognition. The series deals with themes of worker's rights, safety in millwork, child labour laws and the political movement to improve these conditions.

Production
Some of the exteriors were filmed at the Quarry Bank Mill while others in the city centre of Chester and at Chester Crown Court. 
Interiors of the work in the mill were filmed in Manchester because "the real factory floor couldn’t be easily converted from its contemporary function as a museum". Additional filming was completed in the village of Styal and at MediaCityUK in Salford.

Cast
The cast include:
Donald Sumpter – Quarry Bank's founder, Samuel Greg
Barbara Marten – Samuel's wife, Hannah Greg
Jamie Draven – Samuel and Hannah's son, Robert Greg
Andrew Lee Potts – another son, William Greg
Rosilyn Ann Southgate – Mill apprentice
Matthew McNulty  – Daniel Bate
Kerrie Hayes – Esther Price
Katherine Rose Morley – Lucy Garner
Holly Lucas – Susannah Catterall
Sope Dirisu - Peter Gardner
Mark Frost - John Howlett
Ciarán Griffiths – Matthew Boon
Craig Parkinson – Charlie Crout
Sacha Parkinson – Miriam Catterall
Kevin McNally – Mr Timperley
Aidan McArdle – John Doherty
Morgan Watkins – George Windell

Series overview

Episodes

Series 1 (2013)

Series 2 (2014)

Reception
The first episode of Series 1 was aired on the evening of 28 July 2013. The series was well received among UK viewers but received mixed reviews due to its controversial storylines and characters.

Grace Dent of The Independent described it as "so bloody serious, so dry, so gritty Bafta, so bang-you-around-the-head worthy" that she could not describe the first 10 minutes "without laughing". Arifa Akbar, also at The Independent, compared its social realism with the BBC's The Village but noted the plot nevertheless had sufficient intrigue and promise to keep an audience interested.  Ceri Radford in The Telegraph summarised it as "Take every cliché you can think of about the Industrial Revolution, mix them all up into one gloomy morass of woe, and that’s pretty much last night’s opening".

References

External links

Fiction set in 1833
2010s British drama television series
2013 British television series debuts
2014 British television series endings
Channel 4 television dramas
English-language television shows
Television series set in the 1830s
Television series set in the 1840s
Television shows set in Cheshire